WPFO (channel 23) is a television station licensed to Waterville, Maine, United States, serving the Portland area as an affiliate of the Fox network. It is owned by Cunningham Broadcasting, which maintains a local marketing agreement (LMA) with Sinclair Broadcast Group, owner of CBS affiliate WGME-TV (channel 13), for the provision of certain services. However, Sinclair effectively owns WPFO as the majority of Cunningham's stock is owned by the family of deceased group founder Julian Smith. The stations share studios on Northport Drive in the North Deering section of Portland, while WPFO's transmitter is located on Brown Hill west of Raymond.

History

The station began broadcasting on August 27, 1999, as WMPX-TV and was a Pax TV (now Ion Television) affiliate owned by Paxson Communications (now Ion Media Networks). In addition to Pax programming, WMPX carried a small amount of local programming and in 2001, the station began airing rebroadcasts of NBC affiliate WCSH (channel 6)'s 11 p.m. newscasts when NBC had a partnership with Pax. Paxson sold the station in December 2002 to Corporate Media Consultants Group who changed the call sign to the current WPFO. The new calls reflected an affiliation change to Fox, which took place on April 7, 2003, filling a gap created in fall 2001 when WPXT (channel 51) switched to The WB. In the interim, prime time and children's programming from the Fox network was provided exclusively on WFXT (which was owned by the network at the time) for those living on the New Hampshire side of the market, and on Foxnet for cable subscribers throughout the entire state of Maine; WCKD-LP served as a secondary affiliate of Fox during that time, but only carried the network's sports programming. In July 2007, WPFO debuted a new logo and updated website. The website's design was outsourced to Fox Interactive Media which also develops websites for Fox's owned-and-operated stations. WPFO switched website providers to Broadcast Interactive Media in March 2010. Currently WPFO's website provider is Sinclair Interactive Media.

As WPFO, in addition to Fox prime time, sports and syndicated programming, the station produces and airs local paid programming under the titles Fox 23 Lifestyle and Your Hometown. It was announced by the Maine Lottery on April 16, 2010, that starting May 11, WPFO would begin airing the Mega Millions lottery drawings Tuesday and Friday nights at 11 following the hour long 10 o'clock newscast. Maine joined the Mega Millions lottery on May 9 starting ticket sales on that date.

On October 31, 2013, Sinclair Broadcast Group acquired the non-license assets of WPFO from Corporate Media Consultants Group for $13.6 million; the deal made it a sister station to WGME-TV, which already produced newscasts for the station. On November 20, it was announced that Cunningham Broadcasting would acquire the license assets for $3.4 million. The sale of the license assets was approved on June 23, 2017. The sale was completed on August 1.

Programming
Syndicated programming on WPFO includes Maury, Hot Bench, The Doctors, Family Feud, and The Big Bang Theory.

News operation

For a time in the early-2000s, WMPX re-aired some newscasts from WCSH and WLBZ as part of a larger deal between Paxson Communications and Gannett. This station also operated from WCSH's Downtown Portland studios at Congress Square and sold air time jointly with WCSH and WLBZ under a time brokerage agreement. In 2003, a three-hour-long weekday morning talk show with a call-in format called So Goes the Nation began airing. It was hosted by Alan Silberberg and former WVOM host Charlie Horne from the studios of Bangor's Fox affiliate WFVX-LP. Originally seen only on WFVX, simulcasts were later added on WPFO and area radio station WLOB. So Goes the Nation was canceled in September 2004.

From November 9, 2005 until March 27, 2009, WPFO simulcasted WLOB's weekday morning show under the branding The Fox Morning News hosted by Ray Richardson and Ted Talbot. There were short features and news stories from Fox News Channel and weather forecasts with former WGME-TV meteorologist Paul Cousins during breaks in the show. Appropriately for WLOB's conservative talk format, it also featured live call-ins from viewers and listeners. On March 30, 2009, it was replaced by the nationally syndicated morning show The Daily Buzz. WLOB's program moved to MNTV affiliate WPME as The Ray Richardson Show and aired from 6:30 to 7:30 until June, 2013.

On February 5, 2007, WGME began producing a nightly 10 o'clock newscast on WPFO called News 13 on Fox after a news share agreement was established between the two. It is aired from a secondary set at WGME's studios on the corner of Washington Avenue and Northport Drive in the North Deering section of Portland. Starting April 5, 2010, the Sunday-Friday 10 o'clock broadcast was expanded to an hour. The newscast features national content from CBS, CNN, and Sinclair. The newscast was renamed Fox 23 News at Ten on January 30, 2014.

A morning show was launched on WPFO called Good Day Maine also produced by WGME. It is a talk, entertainment, news, weather, and sports program that airs from 7 to 8. The show is the only local morning broadcast during the time slot and competes against CBS This Morning (on WGME), Good Morning America (on WMTW), and Today (on WCSH). This newscast airs from the secondary set at WGME's facilities (which received an update) along with a new secondary weather set (while also using the main weather center outside of WGME's CBS This Morning cut-ins) to deliver weather reports. There is also a live interview desk that was previously used on WGME during news headline updates on that station's weekday morning show and a new light story room which includes a nighttime backdrop of the Portland skyline along with several couches and armchairs. WPFO's website hosted video from both of the WGME-produced newscasts through April 2013; subsequently viewers were directed to a third-party website where individual segments could be purchased for a fee. Launched as a two-hour broadcast, Good Day Maine was shortened to one hour by October 2013 before returning to the two-hour format on September 30, 2019.

On September 15, 2014, WPFO launched Fox 23 News at 6:30, a half-hour weekday newscast scheduled directly against the evening news on the Big Three television networks. It was cancelled on December 23, 2016; Seinfeld reruns began airing in the time slot on December 26.

All WGME-produced newscasts on WPFO were made available in high definition format starting on February 8, 2012; the newscasts are presented in widescreen (letterboxed) format on WPFO's standard definition feed.

10 p.m. newscasts that start late due to sports overruns or other special programming are typically recorded in advance and most often a half-hour in length even on those days when a typical 10 p.m. newscast would be an hour.

Subchannels
The station's digital signal is multiplexed:

References

External links

WGME-TV website

Fox network affiliates
Charge! (TV network) affiliates
Comet (TV network) affiliates
PFO
Sinclair Broadcast Group
Television channels and stations established in 1999
1999 establishments in Maine